The Casa de la Apicultura (translation: Beekeeping House) is a museum in Boal, Asturias, Spain.  It is the home of a collection relating to apiculture, which is a traditional activity in this part of Asturias.

The museum is housed in a former rural school, built by the Sociedad de Instrucción Naturales del Concejo de Boal, a society founded in Havana, Cuba, in 1911. The school was built in the mid-1930s and restored for this new role.  It has two purposes: a cultural focus, as well as training and information for the region's beekeepers. The collection and exhibits, cataloged and inventoried, are primarily concerned with traditional beekeeping.  They are accompanied by a series of informational panels whose content includes text and photos taken from the book, Las abejas, la miel y la cera en la sociedad tradicional asturiana ("Bees, honey and wax in Asturian traditional society"), by Xuaco López Álvarez.

References

Further reading
 López Alvarez, J. (1994). Las abejas, la miel y la cera en la sociedad tradicional asturiana. Oviedo: Real Instituto de Estudios Asturianos.

Museums in Asturias
Bee museums
Beekeeping in Spain
Agriculture museums in Spain